Guillaume Cunnington (born 7 July 1976) is a French racing driver who competed in the TCR International Series, the All-Japan Formula Three Championship with FSC Motorsport. and the Asian Formula Renault Series, where he won the Masters Class in 2014.

Racing career
Cunnington began his career in 2013 in the Asian Formula Renault Series, winning the Masters Class in 2014. From 2015, he is racing in the All-Japan Formula Three Championship national class with the FSC Motorsport team founded by Antoine Malin. The team is powered by TOM'S Racing. In his first season, he finished sixth in the national class standings, with a best overall finish of 4th in Sugo.

In November 2015, he raced in the TCR International Series, driving a SEAT León Cup Racer for Liqui Moly Team Engstler. at the famed Circuito da Guia in Macau, where he finished 17th in the first race before retiring in the second. As of 2017, that was his last professional race.

Racing record

Complete TCR International Series results
(key) (Races in bold indicate pole position) (Races in italics indicate fastest lap)

References

External links
 

1976 births
Living people
Racing drivers from Paris
French racing drivers
Asian Formula Renault Challenge drivers
Japanese Formula 3 Championship drivers
TCR International Series drivers
Asia Racing Team drivers
Engstler Motorsport drivers